is a private junior college in Takayama, Gifu, Japan, established in 1961.

External links
 Official website 

Educational institutions established in 1961
Private universities and colleges in Japan
Universities and colleges in Gifu Prefecture
Japanese junior colleges
1961 establishments in Japan